Tryptase delta is an enzyme that in humans is encoded by the TPSD1 gene.

Tryptases comprise a family of trypsin-like serine proteases, the peptidase family S1. Tryptases are enzymatically active only as heparin-stabilized tetramers, and they are resistant to all known endogenous proteinase inhibitors. Several tryptase genes are clustered on chromosome 16p13.3. These genes are characterized by several distinct features. They have a highly conserved 3' UTR and contain tandem repeat sequences at the 5' flank and 3' UTR which are thought to play a role in regulation of the mRNA stability. Although this gene may be an exception, most of the tryptase genes have an intron immediately upstream of the initiator Met codon, which separates the site of transcription initiation from protein coding sequence. This feature is characteristic of tryptases but is unusual in other genes. Tryptases have been implicated as mediators in the pathogenesis of asthma and other allergic and inflammatory disorders. This gene was once considered to be a pseudogene, although it is now believed to be a functional gene that encodes a protein.

References

Further reading

EC 3.4.21